Aase Schiøtt Jacobsen was a Danish badminton player.

Career
Aase Schiøtt Jacobsen won the women's singles title at the 1949 All England Badminton Championships and the 1951 All England Badminton Championships.

Jacobsen also represented Denmark at the 1957 Uber Cup and won three Danish National Championships.

References

Danish female badminton players
Year of birth missing
2005 deaths
Place of birth missing